The Higer Paradise or later the Higer H5V and Higer H6V, is a light commercial vehicle (van) built by Higer from China as a van, chassis cab, Recreational vehicle, and minibus.

Overview

The Higer Paradise was introduced in China in 2014 with prices of the H5V versions ranging from 210,800 yuan to 292,800 yuan, and H6V versions ranging from 708,000 yuan to 808,000 yuan. Recreational vehicle versions of the H5V was also available while the H6V remains to be the single model electric version of the Higer Paradise. The exterior design is controversial as the styling is clearly a reverse engineered design based on the Mercedes-Benz Sprinter.

References

External links

KLQ6701 Official website
H5V Official website
H5V B camper Official website
H5V C camper Official website

Vehicles introduced in 2014
Minibuses
Vans
Rear-wheel-drive vehicles
2010s cars
Cars of China